Alimah III, also called Halimah III, was the sovereign Sultana regnant of the Anjouan sultanate at Nzwani in the Comoro Islands from c. 1676 until c. 1711. 

She succeeded Alimah II. She was the third of four reigning women of the Anjouan sultanate. She was succeeded by Salim of Anjouan.

References

External links
 Women in power 1670

17th-century births
Comorian people
Year of birth missing
Women rulers in Africa
Sultans of Anjouan
18th-century women rulers
Year of death missing
17th-century women rulers